Larry Sudbrook is a former American baseball coach and player. He served as the baseball coach at St. Bonaventure from 1986 through 2021 season. Under Sudbrook, the St. Bonaventure Bonnies complied as record of 724–814–10 and won or shared two Atlantic 10 Conference East Division titles and the 2004 Atlantic 10 Conference baseball tournament. He played college baseball at Lakeland Community College from 1975 to 1976.

Coaching career
Sudbrook played two seasons at Lakewood Community College before completing his degree at Kent State University. He then coached Fairport Harding High School for five seasons, leading the Skippers to four sectional titles in his tenure.  Since taking over the Bonnies, Sudbrook has coached 32 All-Conference players, 19 future pros, and 10 draft picks. St. Bonaventure claimed the 2004 Atlantic 10 Conference baseball tournament and a berth in the 2004 NCAA Division I baseball tournament.  Sudbrook claimed his 600th victory on April 7, 2013.  He is the Bonnies all-time leader in wins in any sport.

In a 2008 column, a writer for the New York Post wrote the following of Sudbrook: St. Bonaventure is led by a good friend of ours, and easily the best quote in all of college athletics, Larry Sudbrook. Readers of this space likely have never heard of Larry, and will dismiss out-of-hand the best quote in all of college athletics line. However, anyone who ever has met Sudbrook will immediately agree with me – the man is a walking gold mine of classic quotes. On top of that, he is a hell of a baseball coach, as he recently picked up his 500th win.

While departing for a conference series against Charlotte, Sudbrook was detained after authorities found a firearm in his carry-on bag.  He was fined and forfeited his weapon by the Buffalo court, and reprimanded by St. Bonaventure.

On October 4, 2021, Sudbrook announced his retirement from coaching at the end of the calendar year.

Head coaching record
Below is a table of Sudbrook's yearly records as a collegiate head baseball coach.

See also
List of current NCAA Division I baseball coaches

Notes

References

Living people
Kent State University alumni
High school baseball coaches in the United States
Lakeland Lakers baseball players
St. Bonaventure Bonnies baseball coaches
Year of birth missing (living people)